Albert Mangan (February 28, 1915 – June 23, 1993) was an American racewalker. He competed in the men's 50 kilometres walk at the 1936 Summer Olympics.

References

1915 births
1993 deaths
Athletes (track and field) at the 1936 Summer Olympics
American male racewalkers
Olympic track and field athletes of the United States
Place of birth missing